Michael Wolf may refer to:
 Michael Wolf (ice hockey) (born 1981), German ice hockey forward
 Michael Wolf (photographer) (1954–2019), German artist and photographer
 Michael Wolf (statistician) (born 1967), Chaired Professor at the University of Zurich
 Misisipi Mike Wolf, American singer, songwriter and musician

See also 
 Mike Wolfe (disambiguation)
 Michael Wolff (disambiguation)